The Women's time trial of the 2009 Dutch National Time Trial Championships cycling event took place on 27 August 2009 in and around Zaltbommel, Netherlands. The competition was run over a 22.3 km flat course and the first rider started at 17:10. Riders started 1 minute apart from each other. 35 cyclists participated in the contest.

Regina Bruins won the time trial in a time of 29' 06.55", ahead of Kirsten Wild and Ellen van Dijk.

Race details

Starting list

Startlist from wielersupport.nl

Final results

Results from uci.ch and wielersupport.nl

References

External links

Dutch National Time Trial Championships
2009 in women's road cycling